The 1000 metres distance for men in the 2010–11 ISU Speed Skating World Cup was contested over eight races on six occasions, out of a total of eight World Cup occasions for the season, with the first occasion taking place in Heerenveen, Netherlands, on 12–14 November 2010, and the final occasion also taking place in Heerenveen on 4–6 March 2011.

Stefan Groothuis of the Netherlands won the cup, while Lee Kyou-hyuk of South Korea came second, and the defending champion, Shani Davis of the United States, came third.

Top three

Race medallists

Standings
Standings as of 6 March 2011 (end of the season).

References

Men 1000